The Battle of Guanzhong (关中战斗) was a battle fought between the nationalists and the communists during the Chinese Civil War in the post-World War II era and resulted in communist victory.

In the southern front of the nationalist dominated region bordering the communist base in Shaanxi – Gansu – Ningxia, the communist controlled region in Guanzhong had formed a bulge that the nationalists had long planned to eliminate.  The communist base in Guanzhong posed a serious threat to both Guanzhong and eastern Gansu, and also threatened the flank of the nationalist force in their planned attack on the communist capital, Yan'an.  Nationalists had a total of two divisions, totaling six brigades in the region and decided to eliminate the communist base in Guanzhong first.

Order of battle
Nationalist (8,100 total)
48th Brigade of the Reorganized 17th Division
123rd Brigade of the Reorganized 36th Division
135th Brigade of the Reorganized 15th Division
Two security regiments
Communist (3,700 total)
Newly Organized 4th Brigade
3rd Regiment of the 1st Garrison Brigade
7th Regiment of the 3rd Garrison Brigade

On December 31, 1946, nationalist forces consisting of the 48th Brigade of the Reorganized 17th Division, the 123rd Brigade of the Reorganized 36th Division, the 135th Brigade of the Reorganized 15th Division and two security regiments launched their offensive against the communist base in Guanzhong, succeeding in taking regions including Xipodian (西坡店), Gongjiaxie (巩家斜), Changshetou (长舌头), and Wuwangshan (武王山).  The communists, in response, decided to counterattack with their Newly Organized 4th Brigade, the 3rd Regiment of the 1st Garrison Brigade and the 7th Regiment of the 3rd Garrison Brigade.

On January 17, 1947, the 3rd Regiment of the communist 1st Garrison Brigade took the town of Yunyi (旬邑), badly mauling the nationalist defenders in the process. The 143rd Regiment of the 48th Brigade of the nationalist Reorganized 17th Division was immediately dispatched to retake the town, but the communists had already abandoned the town and retreated with the captured supplies.  Replenished with the newly captured supplies from the nationalists, the 3rd Regiment of the communist 1st Garrison Brigade and the communist Newly Organized 4th Brigade launched another round of assaults on nationalist positions aimed to neutralize the nationalist blockade line.  On January 26, 1947, nationalist forts including Liangzhuang (梁庄), Huangpu (黄甫), Baizitou (白子头), Jinchi (金池), and Longao (龙高) fell into enemy hands and over 35 km of nationalist blockade line on the enemy were neutralized by their communist enemy.

The nationalists planned a counterattack in order to restore the blockade.  The 368th Regiment of the 123rd Brigade of the nationalist Reorganized 36th Division at Chunhua (淳化) and the 143rd Regiment of the 48th Brigade of the nationalist Reorganized 17th Division retook Yunyi (旬邑) were order to attack the enemy in a pincer movement.  On January 29, 1947, the 368th Regiment of the 123rd Brigade of the nationalist Reorganized 36th Division reached the region of Tongrun (通润), while the 143rd Regiment of the 48th Brigade of the nationalist Reorganized 17th Division reached the regions of Jinchi (金池), and Longao (龙高).

The communists decided to concentrate their force to annihilate the 368th Regiment of the 123rd Brigade of the nationalist Reorganized 36th Division near the region of Liangzhuang (梁庄), and the 7th Regiment of the communist 3rd Garrison Brigade was tasked to lure the intended nationalist victim into the trap from the region of Weijia (魏家).  The 771st Regiment of the communist Newly Organized 4th Brigade was asked to outflank the intended nationalist victim and to seal off the escaping route of the nationalists. The 16th Regiment of the communist Newly Organized 4th Brigade would fight a blocking action at Huangpu (黄甫), and Yaoli (腰里) regions to prevent the 143rd Regiment of the 48th Brigade of the nationalist Reorganized 17th Division from reinforcing the intended nationalist victim.

On January 30, 1947, the nationalists renewed their attack on their communist enemy, but the advanced of the 143rd Regiment of the 48th Brigade of the nationalist Reorganized 17th Division were checked by the enemy at Huangpu (黄甫), and Yaoli (腰里) regions just as the communists had planned.  After successfully taking the region of Weijia (魏家) in a pincer movement, the 368th Regiment of the 123rd Brigade of the nationalist Reorganized 36th Division continued their push toward the Liangzhuang (梁庄).  The 7th Regiment of the communist 3rd Garrison Brigade lured the 368 Regiment of the 123rd Brigade of the nationalist Reorganized 36th Division near Liangzhuang (梁庄), with the 771st Regiment of the communist Newly Organized 4th Brigade outflanking the nationalist regiment, which was consequently besieged in the communist trap between the region of Ningjia (宁家) and Liangzhuang (梁庄).  After a fierce battle, the besieged nationalist force was completely annihilated, suffering over 930 fatalities, and this nationalist defeat marked the end of the battle of Guanzhong.

Although the communists had managed to score a victory over their nationalist adversaries and managed to keep their base in Guanzhong for the time being, it would not be long before they were forced to give it up once the nationalists were able to muster enough strength later on.  The communists simply did not have the numbers necessary to defend the area.  The nationalist defeat was only a temporary setback which caused the delay of their original plan to take the communist capital.

See also
List of battles of the Chinese Civil War
National Revolutionary Army
History of the People's Liberation Army
Chinese Civil War

References

Zhu, Zongzhen and Wang, Chaoguang, Liberation War History, 1st Edition, Social Scientific Literary Publishing House in Beijing, 2000,  (set)
Zhang, Ping, History of the Liberation War, 1st Edition, Chinese Youth Publishing House in Beijing, 1987,  (pbk.)
Jie, Lifu, Records of the Liberation War: The Decisive Battle of Two Kinds of Fates, 1st Edition, Hebei People's Publishing House in Shijiazhuang, 1990,  (set)
Literary and Historical Research Committee of the Anhui Committee of the Chinese People's Political Consultative Conference, Liberation War, 1st Edition, Anhui People's Publishing House in Hefei, 1987, 
Li, Zuomin, Heroic Division and Iron Horse: Records of the Liberation War, 1st Edition, Chinese Communist Party History Publishing House in Beijing, 2004, 
Wang, Xingsheng, and Zhang, Jingshan, Chinese Liberation War, 1st Edition, People's Liberation Army Literature and Art Publishing House in Beijing, 2001,  (set)
Huang, Youlan, History of the Chinese People's Liberation War, 1st Edition, Archives Publishing House in Beijing, 1992, 
Liu Wusheng, From Yan'an to Beijing: A Collection of Military Records and Research Publications of Important Campaigns in the Liberation War, 1st Edition, Central Literary Publishing House in Beijing, 1993, 
Tang, Yilu and Bi, Jianzhong, History of Chinese People's Liberation Army in Chinese Liberation War, 1st Edition, Military Scientific Publishing House in Beijing, 1993 – 1997,  (Volume 1), 7800219615 (Volume 2), 7800219631 (Volume 3), 7801370937 (Volume 4), and 7801370953 (Volume 5)

Conflicts in 1946
Conflicts in 1947
Battles of the Chinese Civil War
1946 in China
1947 in China